Gold Coast Medical is an Australian factual television which premiered on the Seven Network. The series was filmed at Gold Coast University Hospital and follows the work done by staff in the Gold Coast's largest hospital. Ten episodes of the program have been produced.

The Seven Network previously screened a similar medical factual series Medical Emergency in 2005.

Broadcast
The series was due to air on the Seven Network in September 2015 however its debut was delayed for over a year, and given a new start date of 25 October 2016. The program was again delayed with a revised premiere date of 1 November 2016.

Distributed internationally by Lineup Industries, the series was acquired by Pick in the United Kingdom.

Episodes

References

External links
 
 Seven promotion, Yahoo!7

Australian factual television series
English-language television shows
Seven Network original programming
2016 Australian television series debuts
2017 Australian television series endings
Television shows set in Gold Coast, Queensland
Australian medical television series